Ray Serrano Lopez (born May 9, 2002) is an American professional soccer player who currently plays for Louisville City in the USL Championship.

Career
Serrano who is of Mexican descent, began his youth career with Spokane Shadow in Washington before joining the Seattle Sounders FC academy in 2016.

On February 14, 2018, Serrano signed a professional contract with United Soccer League side Seattle Sounders FC 2.

On January 26, 2022, Serrano signed with USL Championship side Louisville City.

References

External links
Seattle Sounders FC bio
U.S. Soccer Development Academy bio (Seattle Sounders FC)
U.S. Soccer bio

2002 births
Living people
American soccer players
Tacoma Defiance players
Louisville City FC players
Association football midfielders
Soccer players from Washington (state)
USL Championship players
United States men's youth international soccer players
People from Moses Lake, Washington
American sportspeople of Mexican descent